Flockhart is a surname. Notable people with the surname include:

Calista Flockhart, American actress
Eileen Flockhart, American politician
Douglas Flockhart, Scottish rugby player
Joanne Flockhart, Scottish badminton player
Rob Flockhart, Canadian ice hockey player
Ron Flockhart (racing driver), Scottish racing driver
Ron Flockhart (ice hockey), Canadian ice hockey player
Sandy Flockhart, CEO of The Hong Kong and Shanghai Banking Corporation